Kaštel Lukšić is a town within the administrative area of Kaštela in Dalmatia, Croatia.

The town of Kaštela
The town of Kaštela is located on the coast of the Bay of Kaštela. It has over 40 000 inhabitants, and it is the second largest town in the Split and Dalmatia County. It stretches over the length of 17 kilometers.
The town is specific because it developed around 7 settlements or around castles. Kaštel Lukšić is fourth of 7 kastels from East.
Kaštel Sućurac
Kaštel Gomilica
Kaštel Kambelovac
Kaštel Lukšić
Kaštel Stari
Kaštel Novi
Kaštel Štafilić

History

Kaštel Lukšić was built as a castle, by the aristocratic family Vitturi from Trogir, at the end of the 15th century. Kastel Luksic was originally renaissance residency with the inside yard and sea around, but later was connected with the mainland.
Here is situated Kaštela Municipal Museum with permanent exhibition.

Local Interest
Monument of Horticultural & Architecture Vitturi-The town includes the first ever park which was erected by the Nobleman Rados Michell Vitturi in the second part of the 18th century. He was a renowned agricultural expert and President of the Agricultural Academy of Luksic. Since 1968 the park has been protected as a monument of horticultural architecture and culture, covering an area of over 9 hectares. Today the park includes features including aleppo pine, cypress and bay laurel as well as more established characteristics such as several exotic and rare samples of trees.

References

External links
 http://kastela.croatian-adriatic.eu/

Populated places in Split-Dalmatia County